Computer Conflict is a 1980 compilation of two turn-based computer wargame scenarios by Strategic Simulations for the Apple II. The scenarios are imaginary and deal with the defense of Russia during the Cold War.

Gameplay 
Two scenarios are included:

Rebel Force: A single-player scenario dealing with an invasion of a strategic Russian town by rebels. It was originally published as "Conflict" in Australia by Keating Computer Services.

Red Attack!: A two-player competitive scenario dealing with attacking / defending three Russian towns. The battlefield is randomized - both players must agree on a fair one before the scenario begins.

External links 
 Article on Conflict from Play It Again
 Computer Conflict manual from Apple2Online.com

1980 video games
Apple II games
Apple II-only games
Computer wargames
Cold War video games
Multiplayer and single-player video games
Strategic Simulations games
Video games developed in the United States
Video games set in the Soviet Union